Maulana Abdul Hakim is a Pakistani Islamic scholar and politician who severed as a member of the 5th National Assembly of Pakistan from 14 April 1972 to 10 January 1977.

References

Living people
Pakistani Islamic religious leaders
Pakistani MNAs 1972–1977
Jamiat Ulema-e-Islam politicians
People from Nowshera District
Year of birth missing (living people)